The Bâlca is a right tributary of the river Trotuș in Romania. It discharges into the Trotuș in Coțofănești.

References

Rivers of Romania
Rivers of Bacău County